Lawrence Donnelly (born in Boston, Massachusetts) is an Irish-American law attorney, writer and political contributor residing in Ireland. A legal research lecturer at National University of Ireland, Galway (NUIG), he is a regular political commentator on RTÉ Radio 1 and the nightly television news bulletin, RTÉ News on Two, also contributing to his local radio station Galway Bay FM. He has a political column in The Sunday Business Post.

Donnelly came to wider attention when he moderated a debate involving McCain lobbyist Grant Lally and former Congressman Bruce Morrison established by the Law Society and the Literary and Debating Society in the build-up to the 2008 U.S. presidential election, before sitting on the RTÉ television panel on election night, 4 November 2008. He married RTÉ newsreader Eileen Whelan in 2009 and have two sons together Seán and Larry Jr.

References

External links
 NUIG profile

Year of birth missing (living people)
Living people
Academics of the University of Galway
American people of Irish descent
People from County Galway
Business Post people
American expatriates in Ireland